Adventureland may refer to:

Amusement parks 
Adventureland (Disney), an area or "themed land" in several Disney theme parks
Adventureland (Illinois), a defunct amusement park located in Addison, Illinois, USA
Adventureland (Iowa), located in Altoona, Iowa, USA
Adventureland (New York), located in East Farmingdale, New York, USA
Adventureland (United Arab Emirates), located in  Sharjah, United Arab Emirates

Others 
Adventureland (film), a 2009 comedy written and directed by Greg Mottola
Adventureland (video game), a text adventure computer game by Scott Adams
Adventureland, a virtual pinball table in the 2017 video game Pinball FX 3
Adventureland (train), a Burlington Route passenger train from Kansas City, Missouri to Billings, Montana